Schwetzingen station is a through station in Schwetzingen, a town in the German state of Baden-Württemberg and lies not far from its centre. It is located at kilometre 13.6 of the Rhine Railway, which runs from Mannheim via Hockenheim and Graben-Neudorf to Karlsruhe. North of the station, the line to Mannheim-Friedrichsfeld branches to connect with the Main-Neckar Railway; the branch is almost exclusively used by freight. Until 1967, the Heidelberg–Speyer railway gave Schwetzingen direct connections to Heidelberg and Speyer. The only operating section of this line today is the section from Schwetzingen to the industrial area of Hockenheim-Talhaus, which is used for freight traffic.

It is classified by Deutsche Bahn (DB) as a category 4 station. It has three platform tracks and is served exclusively by DB services. Its address is Bahnhofsanlage 1–3.

History 

Schwetzingen station was opened with the Rhine Railway on the Mannheim–Schwetzingen–Hockenheim–Waghäusel–Graben-Neudorf–Eggenstein–Karlsruhe route on 4 August 1870. The line and the station building formed part of the Grand Duchy of Baden State Railway (Großherzoglich Badische Staatseisenbahnen).

In accordance with a law enacted by Baden on 2 February 1870 and a concession issued on 3 April 1872 under the Bavarian-Baden Treaty of 23 November 1871, the Heidelberg–Eppelheim–Plankstadt–Schwetzingen section of the Heidelberg–Speyer railway was opened on 17 July 1873. It was extended to Speyer on 10 December 1873 over a pontoon bridge that had been established for road traffic in 1865. The builder and, until its nationalisation on 1 July 1894, the owner of this line was the Heidelberg Speyer Railway Company (Heidelberg-Speyer-Eisenbahn-Gesellschaft), but it was operated, along with the Rhine Railway, by the Grand Duchy of Baden State Railway. With the opening of this line, Schwetzingen station became a small railway junction.

The Mannheim-Friedrichsfeld–Schwetzingen railway, which branches from the Rhine Railway to the north of the station, was opened on 1 June 1880.

The Schwetzingen–Ketsch tramway was opened by the Rheinische Schuckert-Gesellschaft on 12 December 1910. An overland tramway was opened in 1927 to Schwetzingen of the Schwetzingen–Plankstadt–Eppelheim–Heidelberg route by the Heidelberger Straßen- und Bergbahn AG (Heidelberg Street and Mountain Railway, HSB). Because of a sharp drop in passenger numbers, the line was closed on 31 March 1938.

The Heidelberg–Schwetzingen–Speyer railway was bombed on 13 October 1941 during the Second World War, but not so badly damaged that it was untraffickable. The fixed bridge that had replaced the pontoon bridge in Speyer  in 1938 was blown up by retreating German troops in 1945. As a result, the Oftersheim–Speyer section was closed. Only a short branch line from Schwetzingen station to the industrial area of Hockenheim-Talhaus remained open for freight.

The Rhine railway was electrified in the 1950s.

The Heidelberg–Eppelheim–Plankstadt–Schwetzingen tramway, which was operated by HSB from 1927 to 1974, ran right through the villages, which was convenient for passengers, and provided strong competition to the Heidelberg–Schwetzingen–Speyer railway. Due to low demand the remaining part of the railway was closed for passengers and freight on 1 February 1967. A few years later, however, the Heidelberg–Schwetzingen tramway was closed because of the poor financial situation of the HSB.

Entrance building

The stately entrance building of Schwetzingen station now houses a DB travel centre, a newsagent and several offices. The station building was bought and refurbished by the iib company in 2007.

Platforms

Schwetzingen station has three platform tracks with a side platform next to the station building and an island platform with two faces. Scheduled traffic uses only platform 1 and 2 while platform 5 can be used for the overtaking of slower trains or for the termination of unscheduled trains. Platforms have not yet been made accessible for the disabled, but this is subject to change with the planned extension of the Rhine-Neckar S-Bahn to Karlsruhe. Platforms 2 and 5 on the island platform can only be reached by a pedestrian subway, which starts at the station building. Next to platform 5, there are 7 sets of tracks, which are occasionally used as sidings for freight trains.

Operations

Passenger services 

The station is usually served every hour by Regionalbahn trains on line RB 2 (Biblis–) Mannheim Hbf–Karlsruhe Hbf). During the weekday peak hour there are service at intervals of half an hour, or even a quarter of an hour. Not all of the additional services start from or end in Karlsruhe, but instead start from or end in Waghäusel or Graben-Neudorf. Some Regional-Express services also run in the peak between Mannheim and Karlsruhe, stopping at least in Graben-Neudorf, Waghäusel, Hockenheim, Oftersheim and Schwetzingen. During the International German Gymnastics Festival (Internationales Deutsches Turnfest), which was held between 18 and 26 May 2013, one of two so-called Turnfestzügen (Gymnastics Festival trains) ran between Schwetzingen and Mannheim Hbf.

Connections to urban transport

The Schwetzingen–Ketsch tramway operated from 1910 to 1938. Between 1927 and 1974, the Heidelberg-Eppelheim-Plankstadt-Schwetzingen tramway of the HSB also ended in Schwetzingen. Today bus routes of Busverkehr Rhein-Neckar (BRN, a subsidiary of DB) connect to the neighbouring cities of Mannheim and Heidelberg, stopping at the bus station in front of Schwetzingen station.

Schwetzingen is in the area where fares are set by the Verkehrsverbund Rhein-Neckar (Rhine-Neckar Transport Association, VRN). Within the town, a special fare applies: since the beginning of 2002 a single bus ride for adults in Schwetzingen costs 50 cents and fares for children cost only 25 cents.

Notes

References

External links 

 
 

Railway stations in Baden-Württemberg
Railway stations in Germany opened in 1870